Rajamangala University of Technology Thanyaburi (abbreviated as RMUTT) has been established in the Rajamangala University of Technology Act on 18 January 2005 by including two units together (Rajamangala Institute of Technology Campus and Pathum Thani Undergraduate education in the field).

HistoryRajamangala University of Technology Thanyaburi'' (RMUTT) was established under the name Rajamangala Institute of Technology (RIT) with its campuses found nationwide which consists of nine Rajamangala Universities of Technology. Its original main campus (RMUTT) sits on an area of 750-rai on Rangsit-Nakhon Nayok Road, Tambon Klong 6 (Canal 6), Thanyaburi District, Pathum Thani province. It was one university called Rajamangala University of Technology Thanyaburi (RMUTT).
 
RMUTT  has 10 faculties and one college (Thai Traditional Medicine College''') which offer four levels of educational programs, diploma programs in vocational education, Bachelor's Degree,  Master's Degree and Doctor's Degree programs.
 
Under the Institute of Technology and Vocational Education Act 1975, the Institute of Technology and Vocational Education (ITVE) was founded on 27 February 1975 as a department under the Ministry of Education and took the key roles of a tertiary education Institute in offering educational programs, undertaking research, and providing academic services to the community.

Faculty 
 FACULTY OF ENGINEERING
 FACULTY OF ARCHITECTURE
 FACULTY OF AGRICULTURAL TECHNOLOGY
 FACULTY OF BUSINESS ADMINISTRATION
 FACULTY OF HOME ECONOMICS TECHNOLOGY
 FACULTY OF TECHNICAL EDUCATION
 FACULTY OF LIBERAL ARTS
 FACULTY OF SCIENCE AND TECHNOLOGY
 FACULTY OF MASS COMMUNICATION TECHNOLOGY
 FACULTY OF FINE AND APPLIED
 FACULTY OF NURSING
 THAI TRADITIONAL MEDICINE COLLEGE

The location of the two six-centered universities is at Khlong Luang District and Pathum Thani Campus.

References

Pathum Thani province
Educational institutions established in 2005
2005 establishments in Thailand
Technical universities and colleges in Thailand